Natrophilite is a mineral with the chemical formula NaMnPO4. In a pure form it has a yellow coloration. Its crystals are orthorhombic to dipyramidal. It is transparent to translucent. It is not radioactive. Natrophilite is rated 4.5 to 5 on the Mohs Scale.

References

 Webmineral entry

Sodium minerals
Manganese(II) minerals
Phosphate minerals
Orthorhombic minerals
Minerals in space group 62